Live in Warsaw (also released as Beautiful Love, The Lady from Caracas, Monk's Dream  and At the Warsaw Jamboree) is a 1991 live album by McCoy Tyner that was released by Who's Who in Jazz. The album was recorded for a television broadcast by Polish Channel 1 (which has also been released as a DVD) in October 1991 at the Operatka House in Warsaw, Poland with a solo performance by Tyner. The Allmusic review by William Ruhlmann states that, "A virtual retrospective on a long career by a still-vital artist, Live in Warsaw offers the listener an opportunity to hear Tyner's mature reflections on the music of his past and present in an unfettered context".

Track listing
 "Beautiful Love" (Gillespie, King, Van Alstyne, Young) - 3:20
 "Suddenly" - 5:20
 "Giant Steps" (Coltrane) - 3:32
 "Darn That Dream" (DeLange, Van Heusen) - 5:51
 "Rhythm-A-Ning" (Monk) - 5:56
 "You Taught My Heart to Sing" (Cahn, Tyner) - 4:55
 "Bluesin' With Bob" - 4:37
 "Monk's Dream" (Monk) - 3:39
 "Naima" (Coltrane) - 4:13
 "Miss Bea" - 5:56
 "Rio" - 4:14
 "Lady from Caracas" - 4:15
All compositions by McCoy Tyner except as indicated
Recorded at the Operatka House, Warsaw, Poland on October 24–27, 1991.

Personnel
McCoy Tyner - piano

References

1991 live albums
McCoy Tyner live albums